XIII is the fourth studio album by American heavy metal band Mushroomhead, released on October 14, 2003. The album reached No. 40 on the Billboard 200 and sold 400,000 copies worldwide making it the band's most successful album to date. It is the second Mushroomhead album to be distributed through a major label, and it was also the debut release for then-new guitarists Bronson and Gravy, as well as turntablist/sampler Stitch.

XIII includes the single "Sun Doesn't Rise". Its music video was directed by Vincent Marcone. The video aired frequently on Headbangers Ball upon release. The track "Sun Doesn't Rise" was also featured on the Freddy vs. Jason soundtrack.

Reception 
The album received positive reviews, with critics stating that it was a much more improved version of XX. It could be seen as the first major release of Mushroomhead to review, as XX was only a compilation album featuring songs from their past 3 self-released albums. Some critics complimented on Mushroomhead's extensive use of piano solos and various other instruments.

In 2018, the album was ranked at No. 20 on Revolvers list of "20 Essential Nu-Metal Albums".

Track listing 
All songs written by Mushroomhead, except for "Crazy" written by Seal and Guy Sigsworth.

Bonus tracks 

British copies of the album include the song "Treason" and the instrumental "Loop #6". Enhanced copies were said to have "Along the Way" and "Simpleton" as bonus tracks available for download through a CD identification process from a secret page on Universalmotown.com. Since Mushroomhead left Universal, the page has been removed.

Credits 

Mushroomhead
 Jeffrey Nothing – vocals
 J Mann – vocals
 Pig Benis – bass
 Bronson – guitars
 Gravy – guitars
 Shmotz – keyboards, samples
 ST1TCH – electronics, programming, samples, turntables
 Skinny – drums, percussion

Additional personnel
 Devon Gorman – additional vocals on "One More Day" and "Our Own Way"
 Jens Kidman – additional vocals on "The Dream Is Over"
 Vanessa Solowiowi – photography, layout
 Matt Wallace – mixing, additional production on "Crazy"
 Johnny K – additional production on "Sun Doesn't Rise" and "Nowhere to Go"
 Brian Gardner – mastering

Chart positions

References

2003 albums
Mushroomhead albums
Universal Records albums